Drumchapel United Football Club is a Scottish football club based in the Glasgow district of Drumchapel, currently competing in the .

Formed as an amateur club in 2001, they fielded teams in the Central Scottish AFL and the Football Central Sunday AFL and were winners of the Scottish Amateur Cup in 2007 (runners-up in 2010 and 2011),  also lifting the West of Scotland Cup four times.

The club successfully applied for their first team to join the newly founded West of Scotland Football League for the 2020–21 season.

Beyond the adult teams, there is an established youth system with multiple teams for boys and girls (the latter affiliated to Partick Thistle W.F.C.), and community involvement.

In their first full season in the West of Scotland League, Drumchapel finished 2nd in Conference C. After winning the Strathclyde Cup they went on to secure the Cup-Winners Shield and qualify for the 2022–23 Scottish Cup.

In the 2022–23 Scottish Cup they reached the 4th round, beating Easthouses Lily F.C 3-0, Nairn County 3-1, Gretna 2008 4-1, FC Edinburgh 1-0 before losing 2-1 to Elgin City.

Honours 

 Strathclyde Cup: 2021–22
 East, South & West of Scotland Cup-Winners Shield: 2021–22

References

External links
Official website

Football clubs in Glasgow
Association football clubs established in 2001
2001 establishments in Scotland
West of Scotland Football League teams
Drumchapel